"(You're My) Dream Come True" (also known as "Dream Come True") is a 1962 single by The Temptations. The single is notable for being both The Temptations' first nationally charting single and the first release on Motown Records' Gordy Records imprint. The Temptations' future recordings for Motown would be issued on Gordy until the label was deactivated in the 1988 merger. Previous Temptations recordings had been issued on Motown's Miracle Records imprint, which was deactivated and reorganized as Gordy Records to avoid confusion with Motown's Miracles singing group.

Overview
This marks the first time the group's falsetto Eddie Kendricks was featured as the lead on a single, bass singer Melvin Franklin has a brief solo ("Ohh... better than...") just before the song outro. As the song's narrator, Kendricks tells the woman he loves how much he's devoted to her, and that he'll love "better than anyone before". Previous singles featured Paul Williams as the main lead, while Kendricks had only recorded a few lead lines (usually on the bridge), ad-libs and harmony vocals on some recordings.  After the failure of their first two singles, Gordy decided to try a go in a different direction with the group, writing a smooth mid-tempo balland and assigning Kendricks to the lead. As the Tempts were to be the new label's anchoring act Gordy assigned them its first single.

Written by Motown founder Berry Gordy Jr., the single was The Temptations' first to appear on the Billboard R&B singles chart, peaking in the Top 30 at number 22. Although the single failed to make the Billboard Hot 100 chart, it was a strong regional smash hit in many different areas of the country, and its notable charting on the R&B charts Top 30 was enough to land them a spot on the Motortown Revue. They would later perform a live version for the Motortown Revue Vol. 2 live album. It was also because of this single's minor success that Kendricks would be given the leads on all remaining singles released that year.

Personnel
 Lead vocals by Eddie Kendricks and Melvin Franklin (ad-lib on outro)
 Background vocals by Melvin Franklin, Paul Williams, Al Bryant, and Otis Williams 
 Musitron & Ondioline Instrumentation by Raynoma Liles Gordy
 Other Instrumentation by the Funk Brothers
Additional keyboards by Joe Hunter
Bass by James Jamerson 
Drums by Benny Benjamin
Guitar by Eddie Willis and Joe Messina

Chart history

Footnotes

1962 singles
The Temptations songs
Songs written by Berry Gordy
Song recordings produced by Berry Gordy
Gordy Records singles
1962 songs